Harford County Public Schools is an American public school system serving the residents of Harford County, Maryland.

Schools

Elementary schools
There are thirty-three elementary schools in Harford County. Homestead-Wakefield, William Paca/Old Post Road and Youth's Benefit Elementary schools are two-building campuses housing primary students (Kindergarten-2nd Grade) in one building and intermediate students (3rd Grade-5th Grade) in the other building.

Abingdon Elementary School, Abingdon
Bakerfield Elementary School, Aberdeen
Bel Air Elementary School, Bel Air
Church Creek Elementary School, Belcamp
Churchville Elementary School, Churchville
Darlington Elementary School, Darlington
Deerfield Elementary School, Edgewood
Dublin Elementary School, Street
Edgewood Elementary School, Edgewood
Emmorton Elementary School, Bel Air
Forest Hill Elementary School, Forest Hill
Forest Lakes Elementary School, Forest Hill
Fountain Green Elementary School, Bel Air
George D. Lisby Elementary School at Hillsdale, Aberdeen
Hall's Cross Roads Elementary School, Aberdeen
Havre de Grace Elementary School, Havre de Grace
Hickory Elementary School, Bel Air
Homestead/Wakefield Elementary School, Bel Air
Jarrettsville Elementary School, Jarrettsville
Joppatowne Elementary School, Joppa
Magnolia Elementary School, Joppa
Meadowvale Elementary School, Havre de Grace
Norrisville Elementary School, White Hall
North Bend Elementary School, Jarrettsville
North Harford Elementary School, Pylesville
Prospect Mill Elementary School, Bel Air
Red Pump Elementary School, Bel Air
Ring Factory Elementary School, Bel Air
Riverside Elementary School, Joppa
Roye-Williams Elementary School, Havre de Grace
William Paca/Old Post Road Elementary School, Abingdon
William S. James Elementary School, Abingdon
Youth's Benefit Elementary School, Fallston

Middle schools
There are currently 9 middle schools in Harford County:
Aberdeen Middle School, Aberdeen
Bel Air Middle School, Bel Air
Edgewood Middle School, Edgewood
Fallston Middle School, Fallston
Havre de Grace Middle School, Havre de Grace
Magnolia Middle School, Joppa
North Harford Middle School, Pylesville
Patterson Mill Middle/High School, Bel Air
Southampton Middle School, Bel Air

High schools
There are currently ten high schools in Harford County, including one technical high school.
Aberdeen High School, Aberdeen
Bel Air High School, Bel Air
C. Milton Wright High School, Bel Air
Edgewood High School, Edgewood
Fallston High School, Fallston
Harford Technical High School, Bel Air
Havre de Grace High School, Havre de Grace
Joppatowne High School, Joppa
North Harford High School, Pylesville
Patterson Mill Middle/High School, Bel Air
High School Advanced Placement Scores 2015

Magnet programs
Three HCPS high schools also have or are preparing for magnet programs. Although the Science and Mathematics Academy is a separate institution, it is hosted by and shares some facilities with Aberdeen High School, and Harford Technical High School is in itself a magnet school for academic and technical programs. Edgewood High School is in the beginning stages of the International Baccalaureate Diploma Programme, in which the school will offer college-preparatory courses for its students, who will graduate with an internationally recognized high school diploma. Edgewood also offers the Academy of Finance program.

Academy of Finance at Edgewood High School
Harford Technical High School in Bel Air, Maryland
Homeland Security at Joppatowne High School
International Baccalaureate at Edgewood High School
Natural Resources and Agricultural Science Magnet Program at North Harford High School
Science and Mathematics Academy at Aberdeen High School

Mascots
The school mascots are:
Aberdeen Eagles
Bel Air Bobcats
C. Milton Wright Mustangs
Edgewood Rams
Fallston Cougars
Harford Technical Cobras
Havre de Grace Warriors
Joppatowne Mariners
North Harford Hawks
Patterson Mill Huskies
Magnolia Vikings

Alternative/charter schools
John Archer School, Bel Air, grades K-8

School feeder systems
The images below outline the elementary and middle schools that feed students into each high school. Harford Technical is fed by students from each school, as entry is by application. The feeder system is not all-inclusive, due to magnet programs at Aberdeen, Edgewood, and Joppatowne.

See also
Harford Glen Environmental Education Center
Havre de Grace Colored School Museum and Cultural Center

References

External links
Official website
Facts about HCPS
HCPS district profile
Upper Chesapeake Bay Athletic Conference

 
School districts in Maryland
Education in Harford County, Maryland